The 1946 Utah State Aggies football team was an American football team that represented Utah State Agricultural College in the Mountain States Conference (MSC) during the 1946 college football season. In their 27th season under head coach Dick Romney, the Aggies compiled a 7–2–1 record (4–1–1 against MSC opponents), tied for the MSC championship, and outscored opponents by a total of 220 to 75. The 1946 squad continues to hold the school records for: most rushing yards per attempt (5.9); lowest pass completion percentage allowed (.330); fewest touchdown passes allowed (zero); and fewest total offense attempts allowed per game (50.6).

After losing only one game during the regular season, the team played in the school's first bowl game – the 1947 Raisin Bowl on January 1, 1947, in Fresno, California. The Aggies were defeated by San Jose State, 20-0.

Four Utah State players were named to the all-conference team selected by the Associated Press: center Ralph Maughan (first team), tackle George Nelson (first team), halfback Jay Van Noy (second team), and end Norvel Hansen (second team). Van Noy went on to play six games in Major League Baseball for the St. Louis Cardinals.

Schedule

1947 NFL Draft

The 1947 NFL Draft was held on December 16, 1946. The following Aggie was selected.

References

Utah State
Utah State Aggies football seasons
Mountain States Conference football champion seasons
Utah State Aggies football